Cristina Rodríguez (born c. 1075) was a daughter of Rodrigo Díaz or El Cid and Jimena Díaz.

In 1099 or earlier, she married Ramiro Sánchez of Pamplona, the Tenent-in-Chief of Monzón from 1104. She was the mother of King García Ramírez of Navarre el Restaurador, who in 1130 was married to Margaret of L'Aigle. She was also the mother of Elvira Ramírez, who married before 1137 to Rodrigo Gómez., son of Count Gómez González el de Candespina.

References

Sources 
 
Ian Michael, «Introducción» to his edition of Poema de Mío Cid, Madrid, Castalia, 1976, páge 39. .

Spanish nobility
1070s births
Year of death unknown